Xibalba is an American hardcore punk band from Pomona, California, formed in 2007. The band plays hardcore with influences from death metal and doom metal, with lyrics in English and Spanish. Their debut album, Madre Mia Gracias Por Los Dias (2010) was released through A389 Recordings.  Their second album, Hasta La Muerte (2012), was released by Southern Lord.

History
The band started in 2007 in Pomona, California when long time friends Nate, Brian, Jason and Bryan wanted to play dark and heavy music with eccentric influences. The friends previously performed music in hardcore punk bands together prior to forming Xibalba. In 2012, the band went on an Australian tour with Warbrain and Incendiary. In 2013, they traveled with the "No Way Out" U.S. tour with headliners The Acacia Strain, and Within the Ruins, Fit for an Autopsy, and American Me. 
Xibalba was toured on the "Die Knowing" U.S. tour alongside Comeback Kid, Backtrack, Downpresser, and To the Wind.

Members

Current Members 

 Jason Brunes - drums, backing vocals (2007-present)
 Jensen Huncle - guitar (2007-present)
 Brian Ortiz - guitar, backing vocals (2007-present)
 Nate Rebolledo - vocals (2007-present)
 Martin Stewart

Former Members 

 Mike Salazar - guitar (2014-2015)
 Bryan Valdvia - bass (2007-2014)

Discography

Studio albums
Madre mía gracias por los días (2010)
Hasta la muerte (2012)
Tierra y libertad (2015)
Años en infierno (2020)

Extended plays
Diablo, Con Amor.. Adios. (2017)

Compilations
Earthquake Split (2010)
Split/w Incendiary (2011)
Split/w Suburban Scum (2014)

References

2007 establishments in California
Death metal musical groups from California
Hardcore punk groups from California
Musical groups established in 2007
Musical quintets
Metalcore musical groups from California